This is a list of notable people from St. Louis or St. Louis County in the U.S. state of Missouri. The dates in parentheses represent lifespan, not necessarily dates of actual residence in the city.

A
 Janet Adair (c. 1892–1938), vaudeville and musical comedy performer
 Brooke Adams (born 1984), professional wrestler, best known as Brooke Tessmacher
 Akon (born 1973), real name Aliaune Damala Badara Akon Thiam, musician
 Matt Alber (born 1975), singer-songwriter, musician
 Wilhelm Albers (1840-1904), Wisconsin State Assemblyman
 Devon Alexander (born 1987), professional boxer, IBF welterweight world champion
 Raleigh DeGeer Amyx (1938–2019), collector of Olympic and Presidential memorabilia 
 Maya Angelou (1928–2014), poet, playwright, memoirist (I Know Why the Caged Bird Sings)
 Eberhard Anheuser (1805–1880), businessman, owner of company that would become Anheuser-Busch
 Donald K. Anton (born 1960), Chair of International Law at Griffith University 
 Henry Armstrong (1912–1988), professional boxer, welterweight champion 1938–1940
 Dick Ault (1925–2007), track and field athlete

B

 Josephine Baker (1906–1975), dancer, singer, actress, Légion d'Honneur appointee, civil rights activist
 Scott Bakula (born 1954), actor (Quantum Leap, Star Trek: Enterprise)
 James F. Ballard (1851–1931), pharmaceutical entrepreneur, and art collector
 Thomas P. Barnett (1870–1929), architect and impressionist painter
 Fontella Bass (1940–2012), soul and R&B singer ("Rescue Me")
 Bradley Beal (born 1993), guard for the Washington Wizards of the National Basketball Association
 Cool Papa Bell (1903–1991), Negro league baseball player, Hall of Fame member
 Katherine Bernhardt (born 1975), Contemporary artist, painter
 Robert Benecke (1835–1903), early photographer
 Graham Bensinger (born 1986), sports journalist for ESPN Radio
 Sally Benson (1897–1972), author whose short stories became the book, then movie, Meet Me in St. Louis
 Yogi Berra (1925–2015), Major League Baseball player (New York Yankees 1946–1963), manager, coach, Hall of Famer
 Chuck Berry (1926–2017), Rock and Roll Hall of Fame musician and composer ("Johnny B. Goode")
 Fred Berry (1951–2003), actor (What's Happening!!)
 Joe Besser (1907–1988), actor, comedian, member of The Three Stooges
 Alan Best (1906–1953), Illinois state representative
 Jud Birza (born 1989), model, winner of Survivor: Nicaragua
 Linda Blair (born 1959), actress (The Exorcist)
 Fred Blassie (1918-2003), professional wrestler
 Sean Blakemore (born 1967), actor, Shawn Butler on ABC's General Hospital
 Susan Blow (1843–1916), educator, opened first successful public kindergarten in the U.S.
 Michele Boldrin (born 1956), italian-american politician, economist, academic
 Kit Bond (born 1939), U.S Senator from Missouri
 Daniel Boone (1734–1820), explorer, hunter, soldier, businessman, politician
 Evan Bourne  (born 1983), WWE professional wrestler
 Dylan Brady (born 1993), musician
 Martin Stanislaus Brennan (1845–1927), Catholic priest and scientist
 Christine Brewer (born 1955), Grammy Award winner, soprano
 Lottie Briscoe (1883–1950), stage and silent film actress
 Lou Brock (1939–2020), Major League Baseball player (St. Louis Cardinals 1964–1979), Hall of Famer
 Shirley Brown (born 1947), soul/R&B singer ("Woman to Woman")
 Sterling K. Brown (born 1976), actor 
 Steve Brown (born 1962), darts player
 Butch Buchholz (born 1940), Hall of Fame tennis player
 Jack Buck (1924–2002), Hall of Fame sportscaster, St. Louis Cardinals' announcer 1969–2002
 Joe Buck (born 1969), sportscaster, football and baseball announcer for Fox, son of Jack Buck
 Mark Buehrle (born 1979), Major League Baseball pitcher (Chicago White Sox, Toronto Blue Jays)
 Grace Bumbry (born 1937), opera singer
 Nelle G. Burger (1869-1957), president, Missouri State Woman's Christian Temperance Union
 T-Bone Burnett (born 1948), rock and country performer, composer, and producer
 William S. Burroughs (1914–1997), novelist, social critic, spoken-word performer; grandson of inventor William Seward Burroughs I
 William Seward Burroughs I (1855–1898), inventor of the adding machine, founder of Burroughs Corporation; grandfather of novelist William S. Burroughs
 Adolphus Busch (1839–1913), co-founder of Anheuser-Busch with father-in-law Eberhard Anheuser
 Adolphus Busch III (1891–1946), president and CEO of Anheuser-Busch; son of August Anheuser Busch, Sr.
 August Anheuser Busch, Sr. (1865–1934), president and CEO of Anheuser-Busch; son of Adolphus Busch
 Gussie Busch (August Anheuser Busch, Jr.) (1899–1989), president and CEO of Anheuser-Busch, civic leader, philanthropist
 August Busch III (born 1937), president and CEO of Anheuser-Busch, civic leader
 August Busch IV (born 1964), president and CEO of Anheuser-Busch, civic leader
 Cori Bush (born 1976), U.S. Representative from Missouri 
 Champ Butler (1926–1992), singer
 Norbert Leo Butz (born 1967),  Tony Award-winning actor
 Jim Byrnes (born 1948), actor and musician (Wiseguy, Highlander: The Series)
 Joaquin Buckley (born 1994) Mixed martial arts fighter

C
 Caroline Thomas Rumbold, (1877–1949), botanist
 Thomas Cahill (1864–1951), athlete, coach, businessman; a founding father of American soccer
 Haydee Campbell (d. 1921), kindergarten pioneer in St. Louis
 Kate Capshaw (born 1953), actress (Indiana Jones and the Temple of Doom), wife of Steven Spielberg
 Chip Caray (born 1965), sportscaster for Chicago Cubs, Atlanta Braves and Fox
 Harry Caray (1914–1998), sportscaster, lead announcer for the St. Louis Cardinals (1945–1969) and Chicago Cubs (1981–1997)
 Skip Caray (1939–2008), sportscaster, announcer for the Atlanta Braves (1976–2008)
 Nell Carter (1948–2003), Tony Award-winning singer and actress (Ain't Misbehavin')
 Lucille Cavanagh (1895–1983), vaudeville dancer, later columnist for the Los Angeles Times
 Louis Cella (1866–1918), capitalist, real estate mogul, turfman, and political financier 
 Lori Chalupny (born 1984), U.S. women's national soccer team member
 Cedric the Entertainer (born 1964), actor and comedian 
 Jean Baptiste Charbonneau (1805–1866), explorer, guide, fur trader, military scout, mayor, and gold prospector, born to Sacagawea during the Lewis and Clark Expedition and raised in St. Louis by William Clark
John Cheatham (1855–1918), American firefighter 
 C. J. Cherryh (born 1942), science-fiction novelist
 Chingy (born 1980), real name Howard Bailey, Jr., hip-hop recording artist and actor
 Kate Chopin (1851–1904), novelist (The Awakening)
 Auguste Chouteau (1740–1829), co-founder of St. Louis, urban planner, businessman, civic leader
 David Clarenbach (born 1953), member of Wisconsin State Assembly
 William Clark (1770–1838), explorer, government administrator
 Sarah Clarke (born 1972), actress (24)
 Mac Cody (born 1972),  football player in NFL, CFL, AFL
 Cynthia Coffman (born 1962), American murderer
 Andy Cohen (born 1968), television executive and personality at Bravo network, one of the first openly gay talk-show hosts
 Barry Commoner (1917–2012), biologist, college professor, eco-socialist, and presidential candidate
 Arthur Compton (1892–1962), physicist, Nobel Prize in Physics 1927
 Jimmy Connors (born 1952), professional tennis player, 5-time U.S. Open winner in men's singles
 Bert Convy (1933–1991), actor and game-show host
Sam Coonrod (born 1992), major league pitcher
 Carl Ferdinand Cori (1896–1984); Gerty Cori (1896–1957), biochemists, joint Nobel Prize in Physiology or Medicine 1947
 Zlatko Ćosić (born 1972), artist and filmmaker
 Bob Costas (born 1952), sportscaster, talk-show host
 Bryan Cox (born 1968), NFL linebacker 1991–2002
 Jim Cox (1920–2014), professional football player
 Lavell Crawford (born 1968), stand-up comedian, actor
 Anton Crihan (1893–1993), Romanian politician, professor at University of Paris (Sorbonne)
 James Cuno (born 1951), art historian and museum director

D

 Paul Dana (1975–2006), IndyCar Series driver
 John Danforth (born 1936), statesman, diplomat, attorney, civic leader, U.S. Senator 1977–1995
 William H. Danforth (1870–1956), founder of Ralston Purina Company; grandfather of John Danforth and William H. "Bill" Danforth
 William H. "Bill" Danforth (1926–2020), physician, professor of medicine, and chancellor of Washington University in St. Louis 1971–1995
 Billy Davis Jr. (born 1938), R&B and soul singer, member of The 5th Dimension
 Brad Davis (born 1981), professional soccer player 
 Dwight F. Davis (1879–1945), athlete, government administrator
 Miles Davis (1926–1991), jazz composer and musician, winner of Grammy Lifetime Achievement Award
 April Daye (born 1937), burlesque dancer, fine arts painter, recording artist and jazz singer
 Dizzy Dean (1910–1974), baseball pitcher, broadcaster
 Dan Dierdorf (born 1949), football player, broadcaster
 Phyllis Diller (1917–2012), comedian
 John Doerr (born 1951), venture capitalist
 Domino (born 1972), real name Shawn Antoine Ivy, rapper, born in St. Louis
 Colin Donnell (born 1982), actor, Arrow
 Thom Donovan (born 1974), musician (Lapush)
 Don Doran (born 1954), retired professional soccer player
 Jack Dorsey (born 1976), software architect and businessperson, creator of Twitter and Square
 Bob Dotson (born 1946), broadcast journalist, NBC correspondent
 Tyler Downs (born 2003), U.S. Olympic diver
 Dora Doxey (1879–1921), accused of murder in 1909; found not guilty
 Katherine Dunham (1909–2006), dancer
 Tim Dunigan (born 1955), actor
 Mary Alice Dwyer-Dobbin, television producer

E
 James Eads (1820–1887), engineer
 Thomas Eagleton (1929–2007), statesman, attorney, civic leader
 Charles Eames (1907–1978), designer, filmmaker
 William C. Edenborn (1848–1926), industrialist and inventor
 Jonathan Edwards (born 1944), singer member of The Spinners (American group)
 T. S. Eliot (1888–1965), poet (Nobel Prize, Presidential Medal of Freedom), critic
 William Greenleaf Eliot (1811–1887), educator, medical reformer, civil rights activist; grandfather of T. S. Eliot
 Ezekiel Elliott Professional Football player Dallas Cowboys
 Stanley Elkin (1930–1995), author
 Mary Engelbreit (born 1952), artist
 Glennon Engleman (1927–1999), hitman
 Walker Evans (1903–1975), photographer
 Steve Ewing, singer/actor, The Urge

F

 Max Factor (1904–1996), cosmetics maker
 Lee Falk (1911–1999), comic strip creator
 Eugene Field (1850–1895), author
 Shandi Finnessey (born 1978), Miss USA 2004
 Jenna Fischer (born 1974), actress
 Jamar Fletcher (born 1979), professional football player
 Jason Fletcher (born 1975), sports agent
 Ellen Foley (born 1951), singer, actress
 Mike Ford (born 1995), professional football player
 Richard Fortus (born 1966), musician, Guns N' Roses
 Redd Foxx (1922–1991), comedian, actor
 Malcolm Frager (1935–1991), concert pianist
 James Franciscus (1934–1991), actor (Mr. Novak, Longstreet)
 Clint Frank (1915–1992), college football halfback, Heisman Trophy winner in 1937
 Mary Frann (1943–1998), actress (Newhart)
 Jonathan Franzen (born 1959), author
 Trent Frederic (born 1998), ice hockey player
 David Freese (born 1983), baseball player
 Jaime French (born 1989), comedian, YouTuber, make-up artist
 Tom Friedman (born 1965), artist

G
 Bob Gale (born 1951), screenwriter, film producer
 Alberta Gallatin (1861–1948), stage and screen actress, raised in St. Louis
 Charles Henry Galloway (1871–1931), St. Louis organist, choral conductor, educator, and composer
 Pud Galvin (1856–1902), Major League Baseball player
 Joe Garagiola (1926–2016), baseball player, sportscaster, television personality, author
 Jan Garavaglia (born 1956), Chief Medical Examiner of the District 9 Morgue in Orlando, Florida; television personality
 Dave Garroway (1913–1982), television personality, first host of NBC's Today Show
 William H. Gass (1924–2017), author, critic
 Martha Gellhorn (1908–1998), author and journalist; third wife of Ernest Hemingway
 Richard Gephardt (born 1941), politician
 Steve Gerber (1947–2008), comic-book writer, co-creator of Howard the Duck
 Frances Ginsberg (1955–2010), opera singer
 David Giuntoli (born 1981), actor
 Nikki Glaser (born 1984), comedian
 Martin Goldsmith (born 1952), music writer and radio personality
 John Goodman (born 1952), actor
 Harry Goz (1932–2003), actor, Sealab 2021
 Betty Grable (1916–1973), actress
 Grant Green (1935–1979), jazz guitarist
 Trent Green (born 1970), football player
 Frank S. Greene (1938–2009), Semiconductor researcher and technologist
 Dick Gregory (1932–2017), author, comedian, civil rights 
 Eric Greitens (born 1974), 56th Governor of Missouri 
 Kim Gruenenfelder, author
 Charles Guenther (1920–2008), poet, translator, newspaper critic
 Robert Guillaume (1927–2017), Grammy and Emmy Award-winning actor
 James Gunn (born 1966), screenwriter, director
 Sean Gunn (born 1974), actor
 Moses Gunn (1929–1993), actor
 Virginia Gibson (1925–2013), dancer, singer, actress

H

 Emily Hahn (1905–1997), journalist, author
 Laurell K. Hamilton (born 1963), author
 Jon Hamm (born 1971), Golden Globe Award and Primetime Emmy Award award-winning actor, Mad Men
 Henry Hampton (1940–1998), film producer, Eyes on the Prize: America's Civil Rights Years (1954–1965) and Eyes on the Prize II: America at the Racial Crossroads (1965–1980s)
 Sally Hampton (born 1958), writer, producer
 Harry Hanebrink (1927–1996) Major League Baseball player. Milwaukee Braves (1953, 1957–1958)
 Chuck T. Harmon (born 1979), aka Chuck Harmony, music producer for Mary J. Blige, Celine Dion, Fantasia, Rihanna
 Doris Hart (1925–2015), Hall of Fame tennis player, two-time U.S. Open champion
 John Hartford (1937–2001), musician, Grammy Award winner
 Culver Hastedt (1883–1966), runner, gold medal winner at 1904 Summer Olympics
 Donny Hathaway (1945–1979), Grammy-winning singer, songwriter, producer, composer
 Pat Healy (born 1983), mixed martial arts fighter
 Bob Heil (born 1940), sound and radio engineer
 Julius Hemphill (1938–1995), jazz saxophonist, composer
 George E. Hibbard (1924–1991), art collector, advocate for Tibetan Independence
 George Hickenlooper (1963–2010), filmmaker
 Paul John Hilbert (1949–2001), member of the Texas House of Representatives
 Malcolm Hill (born 1995), American player in the Israel Basketball Premier League
 Al Hirschfeld (1903–2003), artist and cartoonist
 Bobby Hofman (1925–1994), Major League Baseball player
 Solly Hofman (1882–1956), Major League Baseball player
 Erin Marie Hogan (born 1985), actress and activist 
 Robert A. Holekamp (1848–1922), businessman and apiarist
 Jessie Housley Holliman (1905–1984), educator, public muralist, artist
 William H. Holloman III (1924–2010), U.S. Army Air Force officer and combat fighter pilot with the Tuskegee Airmen; U.S. Air Force’s first African American helicopter pilot.  
 August Holtz (1871–1938), United States Navy sailor, Medal of honor recipient
 Ken Holtzman (born 1945), baseball pitcher
 A. E. Hotchner (1917–2020), author, editor, philanthropist
 Elston Howard (1929–1980), baseball player, first black player for New York Yankees
 Ryan Howard (born 1979), baseball player, 2005 NL Rookie of the Year, 2006 National League MVP and All-Star first baseman, Philadelphia Phillies
 Huey (1987–2020), real name Lawrence Franks, Jr., rapper
 Larry Hughes (born 1979), basketball player, Chicago Bulls

I
 Vedad Ibišević (born 1984), Bosnian soccer player
 Eliza Buckley Ingalls(1848–1918), American temperance activist
 William Inge (1913–1973), Pulitzer Prize-winning playwright
 Palestina "Tina" Isa (1972–1989), honor killing victim
 Ernie Isley (born 1952), songwriter, guitarist of soul and R&B group The Isley Brothers
 Ronald Isley (born 1941), lead singer of The Isley Brothers; co-owns St. Louis-based Notifi Records
 Halsey Ives (1847–1911), museum and school founder, director of two world-fair art exhibitions (Louisiana Purchase Exposition and World's Columbian Exposition)

J
 Sean James (born 1978), athlete
 Cam Janssen (born 1984), ice hockey player
 Ella Jenkins (born 1924), musician
 Jibbs (born 1990), real name Jovan Campbell, rapper
 J-Kwon (born 1986), real name Jerrell Jones, rapper
 Jeremiah Johnson (born 1972), blues musician
 Johnnie Johnson (1924–2005), musician
 Scott Joplin  (1867/1868–1917), songwriter (Pulitzer Prize), musician, "King of Ragtime"
 Jackie Joyner-Kersee (born 1962), Olympic gold-medalist track & field athlete; educator; sister of Olympic athlete Al Joyner; sister-in-law of Florence "Flo Jo" Griffith-Joyner
Judith McNaught (born 1944), novelist

K
 Kane (born 1967), real name Glenn Jacobs, professional wrestler
 Stan Kann (1924–2008), musician, entertainer
 Terry Karl (born 1947), professor of Latin American Studies at Stanford University
 Bruce Karsh (born 1955), lawyer and investor
 Ben Kasica (born 1984), musician
 Karen Katen (born 1948), pharmaceutical executive
 Andreas Katsulas (1946–2006), actor (Babylon 5)
 David Kaufman (born 1969), character actor and voice actor (Danny Phantom)
 Jim Kekeris (1923–1997), NFL player
 Ellie Kemper (born 1980), actress
 Dorothea Kent (1916–1990), film actress
 Dickie Kerr (1893–1963), baseball pitcher
 Al Kerth (1952-2002), public relations professional 
 Imrat Khan (1935–2018), Indian classical musician
 Albert King (1923–1992), musician
 Silver King (1868–1938), Major League Baseball player
 Audrey Kissel (1926–2017), All-American Girls Professional Baseball League player
 Kevin Kline (born 1947), Academy Award-winning actor
 Karlie Kloss (born 1992), model
 Marquise Knox (born 1991), blues rock musician
 Chris Koster (born 1964), Attorney General of Missouri 
 Kyle O'Reilly (born 1987), real name Kyle Greenwood, professional wrestler
 Karyn Kusama (born 1968), filmmaker

L
 Pierre Laclede (1729–1778), urban planner; co-founder of St. Louis; government administrator; civic leader
 Pokey Lafarge (born 1983), musician and singer
 Pat LaFontaine (born 1965), NHL hockey player
 Elizabeth Laime (born 1979), podcaster, writer
 Oliver Lake (born 1942), jazz saxophonist, composer
 Christopher Largen (1969–2012), author, filmmaker, journalist, activist
 Jeannie Leavitt (born c. 1967), the United States Air Force's first female fighter pilot
 David Lee (born 1983), NBA basketball player
 Murphy Lee (1979), rapper
 Tod Leiweke (born 1960), sports executive
 Maggie LePique (born 1964), jazz radio host
 Laura Les (born 1994), musician
 Stacey Levine, fiction writer, journalist
 Jenifer Lewis (born 1957), actress
 Charles Lindbergh (1902–1974), adventurer, pilot, soldier, author
 Linda Lingle (born 1953), former Governor of Hawaii
 Theodore Link (1850–1923), architect
 Sonny Liston (1932–1970), heavyweight champion boxer
 John Long (born 1950), blues musician
 Taylor Louderman (born 1990), Broadway actress
 Carl Lutz (1895-1975), Swiss diplomat responsible for saving over 62,000 Jews during World War II

M

 Vicki Mabrey (born 1956), broadcast journalist
 Ed Macauley (1928–2011), Hall of Fame basketball player
 Jeremy Maclin (born 1988), football wide receiver (Baltimore Ravens)
 Justin Marks (born 1981), NASCAR driver
 Patrick Maroon (born 1988), ice hockey player for the St. Louis Blues
 James S. Marshall (1819–1892), Mayor of Green Bay, Wisconsin
 Cuonzo Martin (born 1971), basketball coach for the University of Missouri
 Peter Martin (born 1970), jazz pianist
 Marguerite Martyn (1878–1948), journalist and artist
 Mary Meachum (1801–1869), abolitionist
 John Berry Meachum (1789–1854), founder of the oldest black church in Missouri.
 Marsha Mason (born 1942), Golden Globe Award-winning and Oscar-nominated actress
 William H. Masters (1915–2001) and Virginia E. Johnson (1925–2013), members of a joint research team on human sexual response at Washington University in St. Louis
 Stan Masters (1922–2005), American realism artist
 Ron Mathis (born 1958), Major League baseball player
 Bill Mauldin  (1921–2003), cartoonist, Pulitzer Prize winner 
 Morton D. May (1914–1983), philanthropist, community leader, art collector, chairman of May Department Stores
 Scott Mayfield (born 1992), ice hockey player
 Virginia Mayo (1920–2005), born Virginia Clara Jones, actress
 Emmett McAuliffe, lawyer and talk show host
 Jimmy McCracklin (1921–2012), pianist, vocalist and songwriter
 Michael McDonald (born 1952), singer, Grammy Award winner, lead vocalist on The Doobie Brothers
 Margaret Bischell McFadden (1870–1932), philanthropist and social worker
 Robert McFerrin, Sr. (1921–2006), classical singer, father of Bobby McFerrin
 Robert McHenry (born 1945), encyclopedist and author
 Jim McKelvey (born 1965), computer science engineer, co-founder of Square, a mobile payments company
 Mike McKenna (born 1983), NHL player for the Philadelphia Flyers
 Chuck McKinley (1941–1986), Hall of Fame tennis player, 1963 Wimbledon champion
 Ben McLemore (born 1993), basketball player
 George McManus (1884–1954), creator of comic strip Bringing Up Father
 Larissa Meek (born 1978), Miss Missouri Teen USA 1997, Miss Missouri 2001, creative director at BGT Partners
 David Merrick (1911–2000), theatrical producer (Tony Awards)
 Metro Boomin (born 1993), record producer, songwriter and DJ
 Joyce Meyer (born 1943), religious preacher and speaker
 Bob Miller (1939–1993), MLB pitcher, StL Cardinals, graduated from Beaumont High School
 Jay Miller (1943–1991), basketball player
 Marvin Miller (1913–1985), actor
 David Miller (born 1961), darts player
 George A. Mitchell (1824–1878), founder of Cadillac, Michigan
 Russ Mitchell (born 1960), journalist and television news anchor
 Marie Moentmann (1900-1974), child survivor of industrial accident, wearer of prosthetic device
 Taylor Momsen (born 1993), singer-songwriter, model, actress
 Archie Moore (1916–1998), boxer, world light-heavyweight champion
 Marianne Moore (1887–1972), poet (Pulitzer Prize), essayist, translator
 Agnes Moorehead (1900–1974), Emmy Award-winning and Oscar-nominated actress
Thomas Morse (born 1968), composer
 Bill Mueller (born 1971), baseball player and coach, St Louis Cardinals
 Nick Murphy (born 1979), NFL punter 2002–2005
 Stan Musial (1920–2013), Hall of Fame baseball player for the St. Louis Cardinals

N

 Nelly (born 1974), real name Cornell Haynes, Jr., rapper, singer and actor
 Howard Nemerov (1920–1991), poet (Pulitzer Prize, Poet Laureate of the United States), author, critic
 Eric Nenninger (born 1978), actor
 Eric P. Newman (1911–2017), numismatist 
 Todd Newton (born 1970), game show host, radio personality  
 Dustin Nguyen (born 1962), Vietnamese American actor
 Rich Niemann (born 1946), athlete
 Frank Nuderscher (1880–1959), American Impressionist painter

O
 Dan O'Bannon (1946–2009), screenwriter, director
 Gyo Obata (1923–2022), architect
 Anne-Marie O'Connor, journalist, author
 St. Louis Jimmy Oden (1903–1977), real name James Burke Oden, blues musician
 Franklin W. Olin (1860–1951), industrialist, philanthropist
 Angel Olsen (born 1987), folk and indie rock musician
 Walter J. Ong (1912–2003), scholar
 Howard Orenstein (born 1955), Minnesota state legislator and lawyer
 Barry Orton (1958–2021), professional wrestler
 "Cowboy" Bob Orton (born 1950), former professional wrestler
 Randy Orton (born 1980), professional wrestler
 Josh Outman (born 1984), Major League Baseball player, Oakland Athletics

P

 David Packouz (born 1982), international arms dealer and subject of 2016 film Arms and the Dudes
 Ken Page (born 1954), actor, voice actor, cabaret singer
 Lucia Pamela (1904–2002), musician, mother of Georgia Frontiere
 James Pankow (born 1947), trombone player, of Chicago
 John Pankow (born 1954), actor (Beverly Hills Cop, Mad About You)
 Leslie Parnas (1931–2022), classical cellist
 King Parsons (born 1949), professional wrestler
 Ann Peebles (born 1947), soul singer, songwriter
 D. H. Peligro (born 1959), real name born Darren Henley, drummer for Dead Kennedys and Red Hot Chili Peppers
 Frank P. Pellegrino (1901–1975), businessman, philanthropist, chief executive officer of International Hat Company
 Marlin Perkins (1905–1986), zoologist, Emmy Award-winning broadcaster
 Evan Peters (born 1987), actor (American Horror Story)
 Mike Peters (born 1943), Pulitzer Prize-winning editorial cartoonist and comic strip artist, creator of Mother Goose and Grimm
 Stone Phillips (born 1954), television journalist
 Julie Piekarski (born 1963), Mouseketeer, actress
 Bill Porter (1931–2010), audio engineer
 Otto Porter (born 1993), Small Forward of the Chicago Bulls
 Louise Post (born 1966), musician (Veruca Salt)
Joseph W. Postlewaite (1827–1889), musician
 Emil Preetorius (1827–1905), journalist
 Vincent Price (1911–1993), actor (House of Wax, The Ten Commandments, The Fly, Edward Scissorhands)
 John G. Priest (1822-1900), real estate dealer, philanthropist, first St. Louis Veiled Prophet
 Victor Proetz (1897–1966), architect, designer, author of poetry and verse
 Joseph Pulitzer (1847–1911), publisher, philanthropist, creator of the Pulitzer Prize and many U.S. newspapers
 Kevin Puts (born 1972), composer, 2012 Pulitzer Prize in Music, 2023 Grammy Award for Best Contemporary Classical Composition

R
 Neil Rackers (born 1976), athlete, placekicker for Arizona Cardinals
 Harold Ramis (1944–2014), author, director, actor; graduated from Washington University (1966)
 Judy Rankin (born 1945), professional golfer and TV commentator, World Golf Hall of Famer
 David Rasche (born 1944), actor
 Peter H. Raven (born 1936), botanist, academic administrator, civic leader
 Hank Raymonds (1924–2010), coached Marquette University men's basketball 1977–83; athletic director 1977-87
 Tim Ream (born 1987), professional soccer player, defender for Fulham FC of Football League Championship and United States men's national soccer team
 Wallace Reid (1891–1923), actor, early cinema sex symbol
 Steven Reigns (born 1975), poet, activist, educator
 Hadley Richardson (1891–1979), first wife of Ernest Hemingway
 Branch Rickey (1881–1965), baseball executive
 Rob Riti (born 1976), football player
 Doris Roberts (1925–2016), actress (Everybody Loves Raymond)
 Leonard Roberts (born 1972), actor
 Lance Robertson (born 1965), musician and host of children's television show Yo Gabba Gabba! (as DJ Lance Rock)
 Harry Rogers (born 1950), professional basketball player
 Mike Rodgers (born 1985), track and field sprinter
 Irma S. Rombauer (1877–1962), author
 Jean Rouverol (1916-2017), author, actress and screenwriter; blacklisted in the 1950s
 Jack Rowe (1856–1911), major league baseball player
 Charles M. Russell (1864–1926), artist, storyteller

S
 John S. Samuel (1913–2002), U.S. Air Force Major General
 Claire Saffitz (born 1986), Chef and personality on Bon Appétit magazine's YouTube channel 
 David Sanborn (born 1945), musician, Grammy Award winner
 Becky Sauerbrunn (born 1985), soccer player
 Edward Saxon (born 1956), film producer (The Silence of the Lambs)
 Max Scherzer (born 1984), MLB pitcher
 Phyllis Schlafly (1924–2016), socially conservative Republican author, broadcaster, and political organizer
 Zander Schloss (born 1961), bassist for the Circle Jerks and The Weirdos; actor
 Red Schoendienst (1923–2018), Hall of Fame second baseman, coach, manager for St. Louis Cardinals
 Chris Schuler (born 1987), professional soccer player for Real Salt Lake
 Dred Scott (1799–1858) and Harriet Scott (1815–1860), civil rights activists
 Robert Sexton, music video and virtual reality director, and former musician
 Art Shamsky (born 1941), Major League Baseball outfielder and Israel Baseball League manager
 Mike Shannon (born 1939), affiliated with St. Louis Cardinals for over 50 years, as a player (1962–1970), in front office, and, since 1972, radio and TV announcer
 Scott Shannon (born 1947), a radio disk jockey hosting WCBS-FM in New York City.
 Augustus Shapleigh (1810–1902), president of Shapleigh Hardware Company and early pioneer of St. Louis
 Henry Shaw (1800–1889), botanist, philanthropist, businessman, author
 Rick Shaw (1938–2017), disc jockey, radio and television personality (WQAM, WAXY, WMXJ, WLBW), born in East St. Louis
 William Tecumseh Sherman (1820–1891), soldier; commander of United States Army
 Roberta Sherwood (1913–1999), singer and actress
 Sherman Silber, physician and infertility specialist
 Frank Simek (born 1984), soccer player with Sheffield Wednesday, also USA International
 Kimora Lee Simmons (born 1975), model and mogul
 Leonard Slatkin (born 1944), conductor, Grammy Award winner
 Slayyyter (born 1996), pop musician
 Jane Smiley (born 1949), Pulitzer Prize-winning novelist
 Nikko Smith (born 1982), singer, American Idol contestant; son of Ozzie Smith
 Ozzie Smith (born 1954), Hall of Fame shortstop for St. Louis Cardinals
 Phyllis Smith (born 1952), actress on NBC's The Office and Disney's movie Inside Out
 Willie Mae Ford Smith (1904–1994), singer
 Philip Sneed, singer, musician (Story Of The Year, Greek Fire), writer, radio personality
 Solar Trance, Rock band 
 Cory Spinks (born 1978), world champion boxer
 Leon Spinks (1953–2021), world champion boxer
 Michael Spinks (born 1956), world champion boxer
 Max C. Starkloff (1858-1942), St. Louis Health Commissioner who introduced social distancing during the 1918 flu pandemic
 Paul Stastny (born 1985), hockey player for St. Louis Blues
 Yan Stastny (born 1982), hockey player for St. Louis Blues
 Harry Steinfeldt (1877–1914), Major League Baseball player
 Edward Steinhardt (born 1961), poet and author
 Chuck Stone (1924–2014), journalist, educator and civil rights activist
 Stevie Stone (born 1981), rapper, born in Columbia, raised in St. Louis, signed to Kansas City-based Strange Music
 Willie Sudhoff (1874–1917), Major League Baseball player
 Roosevelt Sykes (1906–1983), blues musician
 James W. Symington (born 1927), U.S. Representative, statesman, attorney
 SZA (born 1990), real name Solana Rowe, singer-songwriter, TDE (Top Dawg Entertainment) record label
 Smino (born 1991), real name Christopher Smith Jr, rapper, singer, songwriter, Zero Fatigue record label

T

 Jim Talent (born 1956), politician
 Jayson Tatum (born 1998), guard for the Boston Celtics of the National Basketball Association
 Sara Teasdale (1884–1933), poet (Pulitzer Prize)
 Clark Terry (1920–2015), jazz musician
 George Thampy (born 1987), 2000 Scripps National Spelling Bee champion
 Lou Thesz (1916–2002), professional wrestler
 David Thirdkill (born 1960), NBA basketball player; 1993 Israeli Basketball Premier League MVP
 Todd Thomas (born 1961), fashion designer
 Kay Thompson (1909–1998), singer, songwriter, author of Eloise books
Conrad Tillard (born 1964), politician, Baptist minister, radio host, author, and activist
 Cap Tilles (1865–1951), race track magnate, philanthropist, founder of Tilles Park
 Gina Tognoni (born 1973), actress
 Guy Torry (born 1969), actor and comedian
 Joe Torry (born 1965), actor and comedian
 Scott Touzinsky (born 1982), volleyball player and coach
 Henry Townsend (1909–2006), musician
 Toya (born 1983), real name LaToya Rodriguez, R&B singer
 Maury Travis (1965-2002), murderer and suspected serial killer
 Helen Traubel (1899–1972), classical and popular singer
 Julie Tristan, American television personality 
 Quincy Troupe (born 1939), poet, editor, journalist
 Ernest Trova (1927–2009), artist
 Ross H. Trower (1922–2014), Chief of Chaplains, U.S. Navy
 Harry S. Truman (1884–1972), 33rd U.S. President
 Truth Hurts (born 1971), real name Shari Watson, R&B singer
 Orrin Tucker (1911–2011), bandleader
 Debbye Turner (born 1965), Miss America 1990, TV journalist
 Ike Turner (1931–2007), singer, musician, agent and production administrator
 Jessie Franklin Turner (1881–1956), fashion designer
 Tina Turner (born 1939), real name Anna Mae Bullock, Grammy Award-winning singer, actress, pop-culture icon
 Taylor Twellman (born 1980), professional soccer player
 Alex Tyus (born 1988), American-Israeli professional basketball player, also plays for Israeli national basketball team

U
 David King Udall (1851–1938), politician

V
 Mark Valenti, screenwriter and novelist
 Courtney Van Buren, National Football League player
 Mona Van Duyn (1921–2004), poet (Pulitzer Prize, Poet Laureate of the United States), editor
 George Van Haltren (1866–1945), Major League Baseball player
 Andrew Volpe, guitarist and lead singer of the St. Louis-based band Ludo
 Marilyn vos Savant (born 1946), columnist, known for having the world's highest IQ

W
 Jack Wagner (born 1959), actor
 Caroline Holme Walker (1863-1955), composer
 Rosa Kershaw Walker (1840s-1909), author, journalist, editor
 Kenny Wallace (born 1963), NASCAR driver
 Mike Wallace (born 1959), NASCAR driver
 Rusty Wallace (born 1956), NASCAR champion driver
 Steve Wallace (born 1987), NASCAR driver
 Trey Waltke (born 1955), tennis player, won ATP title in 1980
 Maxine Waters (born 1938), politician
 Leroy H. Watson (1893-1975), U.S. Army major general
 Earl Weaver (1930–2013), Hall of Fame baseball manager
 Dick Weber (1929–2005), professional bowler
 Harry Weber (born 1942), sculptor
 William H. Webster (born 1924), former director of the FBI and CIA, Chairman of the Homeland Security Advisory Council
 Dave Weckl (born 1960), musician, drummer
 Annie Wersching (born 1977), actress, played Renee Walker on TV series 24
 Jo Jo White (1946–2018), basketball player
 Joseph T. White (1961–1985), United States Army soldier who defected to North Korea on August 28, 1982
 Verner Moore White (1863–1923), artist
 Marissa Whitley (born 1983), Miss Teen USA 2001
 Mary Wickes (1910–1995), actress
 Chris Wideman (born 1990), NHL player
 Bill Wilkerson (1945–2017), sports announcer and radio personality (KMOX)
 Violet Wilkey (1903–1976), actress
 Melvin Williams (born 1979), NFL player
 Tennessee Williams (1911–1983), real name Thomas Lanier, Pulitzer Prize-winning playwright
 Mykelti Williamson (born 1957), actor, played Bubba Blue in 1994 film Forrest Gump
 Ike Willis (born c. 1957), musician
 Angela Winbush (born 1955), R&B/soul singer, songwriter
 Devon Windsor (born 1994), model
 Trey Wingo (born 1955), sports journalist (KSDK-TV, ESPN)
 Kellen Winslow (born 1957), NFL football player, Hall of Famer
 Shelley Winters (1920–2006), Academy Award-winning actress
 Edwin E. Woodman (1838–1912), Wisconsin State Senator
 Harriett Woods (1927–2007), politician; two-time Democratic nominee for the U.S. Senate from Missouri; former Lieutenant Governor
 Dan Wool, musician, composer with group Pray for Rain

X-Y-Z
 Clyde X (1931–2009), leader in the Nation of Islam

References

External links

 St. Louis African-American Biography Master Index
 St. Louis artists
 St. Louis and Missouri authors
 St. Louis Media Archives: Guide to Collections
 St. Louis Walk of Fame
 St. Louis Women's Biography Master Index

People
St. Louis